Haniel Vinícius Inoue Langaro (born 7 March 1995) is a Brazilian handball player for FC Barcelona and the Brazilian handball team.

He participated at the 2016 Summer Olympics in Rio de Janeiro, in the men's handball tournament.

Individual awards
2020 South and Central American Men's Handball Championship: Best left back

References

External links

1995 births
Living people
Brazilian male handball players
Olympic handball players of Brazil
Expatriate handball players
Brazilian expatriate sportspeople in France
Brazilian expatriate sportspeople in Spain
Liga ASOBAL players
Handball players at the 2016 Summer Olympics
People from Umuarama
Pan American Games medalists in handball
Pan American Games bronze medalists for Brazil
Handball players at the 2019 Pan American Games
Medalists at the 2019 Pan American Games
Handball players at the 2020 Summer Olympics
Sportspeople from Paraná (state)
21st-century Brazilian people